Juliet Cadzow is a Scottish film and television actress. She played Edie McCredie in the children's television series Balamory, Suzie Fraser in BBC series River City and various roles in BBC series Still Game.

Career
Cadzow started her career with Billy Connolly in "The Great Northern Welly Boot Show". She then went on to have seasons at the Dundee Repertory Theatre, The Traverse, The Lyceum, Salisbury, Watford, Wildcat, 7.84, Borderline Theatre, The Young Vic, and Citizen's Theatre.

In the television comedy series Still Game, she played the roles of Winston's fantasy woman and the conductress, whom her character became when he was awakened. 
She was nominated for "Best Actress" at the 1997 BAFTA Scotland Awards for her role in the 1992 film Upstate.

In 2011, Cadzow played Gabriella Catalano in ‘Fast Romance.’ 

In 2012, Juliet provided the voice of the resurrected 'Ice Governess' in the Doctor Who Christmas special of 2012 The Snowmen.

In 2018 and 2022, she appeared in two episodes of Molly & Mack as Mrs Anderson. 

In 2018, she appeared in Clique as Glyn Michaels.

In 2022, Juliet celebrated twenty years of Balamory, with television appearances on BBC The Nine and radio stations such as BBC Radio Scotland and BBC Radio WM.

Cadzow is currently starring as regular Susie Fraser in River City, she joined the cast in 2018. 

She has played in various pantomimes in the UK over the years and has also appeared in the television series Casualty and Coronation Street.

In 2023, Cadzow appeared as a guest on a documentary about 100 years of BBC Scotland alongside Balamory co-star Julie Wilson Nimmo and River City cast members, it aired on BBC Radio Scotland and BBC Scotland channel.

Awards and recognition
She was nominated for "Best Actress" at the 1997 BAFTA Scotland Awards for her role in the 1992 film Upstate.

In 2017, Cadzow received the Lord Provost of Glasgow Award for Performing Arts and for her work at Glasgow Caledonian University, where she is a Cultural Fellow.

Filmography

Film

Television

Radio

References

External links
 
 Juliet Cadzow, Actor. at Glasgow West End
 Juliet Cadzow, on Instagram

Living people
Place of birth missing (living people)
Scottish film actresses
Scottish soap opera actresses
Scottish television actresses
Scottish radio actresses
Year of birth missing (living people)